Amaurobius pavesii is a species of spider in the family Amaurobiidae, found in Italy.

References

pavesii
Spiders of Europe
Spiders described in 1991